ST Empire Rosa was the name of two tugs:

 , a 593 GRT tug built by Clelands (Successors) Ltd, Willington Quay-on-Tyne.
 , a 292 GRT tug built by Blyth Dry Docks & Shipbuilding Co Ltd.

Ship names